Stephen Laurel "tWitch" Boss (September 29, 1982December 13, 2022) was an American freestyle hip hop dancer, choreographer, actor, television producer, and television personality. In 2008, he finished in second place on the American version of So You Think You Can Dance (SYTYCD). From 2014 to May 2022, he was featured on The Ellen DeGeneres Show as a repeated guest host and he was also a co-executive producer of the program. He was featured in Ellen's Game of Games as a sidekick to DeGeneres. Between 2018 and 2020, he and his wife, Allison Holker, hosted Disney's Fairy Tale Weddings on Freeform and Disney+.

Early life 

Boss was born on September 29, 1982, to Connie Boss Alexander and Sandford Rose in Montgomery, Alabama. He graduated from Lee High School in 2000 and studied dance performance at Southern Union State Community College in Wadley, Alabama, and Chapman University.

Career 

In 2003, Boss was a semifinalist on MTV's The Wade Robson Project and a runner-up on the television talent competition Star Search. He choreographed routines for South Korean pop/R&B singer Seven and helped train other YG Entertainment artists including Big Bang. In 2007, he was an uncredited "flamboyant dancer" in Blades of Glory and a Maybelle's Store Dancer in Hairspray.

After competing in So You Think You Can Dance, he taught dancing at South County Classical Ballet with fellow finalist Katee Shean. On April 30, 2013, he and Allison Holker performed a dance routine on Dancing with the Stars. They danced to "Crystallize" which was performed live by Lindsey Stirling.

Beginning on April 1, 2014, Boss was featured on The Ellen DeGeneres Show as a guest DJ. In October 2014, he announced that he had been cast in Magic Mike XXL. On August 17, 2020, he became a co-executive producer of Ellen DeGeneres' daytime talk show.

Boss was cast as Marcel X in the superhero movie Perfectus and later he had a feature role in the movie Ushers. He was a member of the dance troupes Breed OCLA and Chill Factor Crew.

So You Think You Can Dance 

Boss first auditioned in 2007 for Season 3 of the show and appeared on the program but was not selected to be in the Top 20. He returned to audition again in Season 4 in 2008; he was selected to compete in the Top 20 and finished the competition as runner-up to fellow hip-hop dancer Joshua Allen. During Season 4 he danced with Katee Shean to a contemporary piece choreographed by Mia Michaels. The dance was nominated for an Emmy for choreography in the 61st Primetime Emmy Awards.

In season 5, Boss appeared again on So You Think You Can Dance with fellow season 4 contestant Katee Shean to perform their Emmy-nominated piece "Mercy," choreographed by Mia Michaels. He was one of the eleven "All-Stars" in season 7. He was an All-Star in Seasons 7, 8, and 9 of So You Think You Can Dance, performing memorable routines including the hip hop number "Outta Your Mind" with ballet dancer Alex Wong, which was reprised by Ellen DeGeneres in Season 7's finale. He was the team captain for "Team Street" in Season 12 of So You Think You Can Dance. He was announced as a permanent judge for the seventeenth season in 2022.

Twitch and Allison Holker, his wife, had an apparel line of athleisure named "DSG x tWitch + Allison Collection" which was sold by Dick's Sporting Goods.

Disney's Fairy Tale Weddings 

Disney's Fairy Tale Weddings is a documentary television series featuring couples and their Disney-themed weddings, airing on Disney's Freeform network and the Disney+ streaming service. The show is a behind-the-scenes program featuring the weddings and engagements of couples at Disney destinations including Walt Disney World, Disneyland, Disney Cruise Line, and at Aulani in Hawaii. On October 17, 2017, Freeform announced the production of a seven-episode series to be released in the summer of 2018; it was hosted by Boss and Allison Holker. In November 2017, Freeform added a December 11, 2017, hour-long special, "Disney's Fairy Tale Weddings: Holiday Magic" as a part of its "25 Days of Christmas" event. Season 2 premiered on Disney+ on February 14, 2020.

Personal life 

On December 10, 2013, Boss and fellow SYTYCD alum Allison Holker married at Nigel Lythgoe's Villa San Juliette Vineyard and Winery in  Paso Robles, California. He also adopted Holker's daughter. Their son was born in March 2016, and their daughter was born in November 2019.

Death 
On December 13, 2022, Boss's wife, Allison Holker, informed officials at the Los Angeles Police Department that he had left their home without taking his car, which was unusual behavior. Police received a call about a shooting at the Oak Tree Inn in Encino, Los Angeles, where Boss was found dead after failing to check out of the motel. His death was ruled a suicide. He was 40 years old.

His funeral and burial service took place on January 4, 2023 in Los Angeles. Boss' remains were interred at Forest Lawn Memorial Park.

Filmography

Film 
{| class="wikitable sortable"
|-
! Year
! Title
! Role
! class="unsortable"|Notes
! class="unsortable"|
|-
| rowspan=2|2007 || Blades of Glory || Flamboyant Dancer || Uncredited || 
|-
|Hairspray || Maybelle's Store Dancer || || 
|-
| rowspan=2|2010 || Stomp the Yard: Homecoming || Taz ||  || 
|-
|Step Up 3D || rowspan=3|Jason Hardlerson ||  || rowspan=3|
|-
| 2012 || Step Up Revolution || 
|-
| 2014 || Step Up: All In || 
|-
| 2015 || Magic Mike XXL || Malik ||  || 
|-
| 2022 || The Hip Hop Nutcracker || Dad || Disney+ release; final role || 
|}

 Television 

 Web series 

 Awards 
 Runner Up, Star Search, 2003
 3rd Place, MTV's The Wade Robson Project, 2003
 Runner Up, Season 4 of So You Think You Can Dance'', 2008

References

External links 
 
 
 Interview with tWitch on Fox 11

1982 births
2022 deaths
2022 suicides
21st-century American dancers
21st-century American male actors
African-American DJs
African-American male actors
African-American male dancers
American DJs
American hip hop dancers
American male dancers
American male film actors
American male television actors
Chapman University alumni
Dancers from Alabama
Judges in American reality television series
Male actors from Montgomery, Alabama
So You Think You Can Dance (American TV series) contestants
Suicides by firearm in California
The Ellen DeGeneres Show